Ostrinia penitalis, the American lotus borer, is a moth in the family Crambidae. It was described by Augustus Radcliffe Grote in 1876. It is found from Mexico, through Central America to Amazonas, Brazil. It is also found in North America, where it has been recorded from Quebec to British Columbia and most of the United States. The habitat consists of marshes and pondsides.

The wingspan is about 21 mm. The forewings are orangish to light brown. The hindwings are light grey with yellowish shading in the outer half, a dark discal spot and dark postmedial and subterminal lines. Adults have been recorded on wing from May to September in the northern part of the range.

The larvae feed on Nelumbo lutea and Polygonum species. Young larvae attach themselves to the leaf by a thin silken strand. Full-grown larvae feed under a loose silk net, and roll the leaves. They then tunnel into the leaf petiole and form a burrow where pupation takes place. The larvae have a pale greenish-yellow body and a brownish head.

Subspecies
Ostrinia penitalis penitalis
Ostrinia penitalis brasiliensis Mutuura & Munroe, 1970 (Brazil)
Ostrinia penitalis rubrifusa (Hampson, 1913) (Jamaica)

References

Moths described in 1876
Pyraustinae